Axel Zingle (born 18 December 1998) is a French cyclist, who currently rides for UCI WorldTeam .

Major results

Road

2020
 1st  Road race, National Under-23 Road Championships
 9th Paris–Camembert
2021
 1st Stage 1 Tour de Guadeloupe
 3rd Classic Grand Besançon Doubs
 6th Tour du Jura
 8th Route Adélie
 8th Tour de Vendée
2022
 1st Route Adélie
 1st Famenne Ardenne Classic
 3rd Road race, National Road Championships
 3rd Tour du Jura
 4th Overall Arctic Race of Norway
1st  Points classification
1st Stage 1
 5th Overall Circuit de la Sarthe
 7th Cholet-Pays de la Loire
 7th Druivenkoers Overijse
 8th Grand Prix de Wallonie
 9th Paris–Bourges
 10th Paris–Camembert
 10th Grote Prijs Marcel Kint
2023
 1st Classic Loire Atlantique
 4th Trofeo Ses Salines–Alcúdia
 5th Trofeo Calvia
 7th Cholet-Pays de la Loire
 9th Trofeo Palma

Mountain Bike

2016
 1st Roc d'Azur Juniors
 European Championships
2nd  Mixed relay
3rd  Junior Cross-country
 3rd Cross-country, National Junior Championships
2018
 2nd Cross-country, National Under-23 Championships

References

External links

1998 births
Living people
French male cyclists
Sportspeople from Mulhouse
Cyclists from Grand Est